Rockin' Chair is an album by American jazz trumpeter Roy Eldridge recorded in 1951 and 1952 and originally released on the Clef label.

Reception

AllMusic awarded the album 4½ stars.

Track listing
 "I See Everybody's Baby" (Robert Dade, George Williams) - 2:54  	
 "Little Jazz" (Roy Eldridge, Buster Harding) - 2:38 	
 "Basin Street Blues" (Spencer Williams) - 2:43
 "I Remember Harlem" (Eldridge, Bob Astor, Williams) - 3:30	
 "Rockin' Chair" (Hoagy Carmichael) - 3:16 	
 "Easter Parade" (Irving Berlin) - 2:50 	
 "Roy's Riff" (Eldridge) - 3:09 	
 "Wrap Your Troubles in Dreams" (Harry Barris, Ted Koehler, Billy Moll) - 3:21
 "Baby What's The Matter With You" (Teddy Brannon, Sam Theard) - 3:21	
 "Yard Dog" (Eldridge, Harding) - 2:56 	
 "Sweet Lorraine" (Cliff Burwell, Mitchell Parish) - 2:52
 "Jumbo the Elephant" (Eldridge, Astor) - 2:49 
Recorded in New York City in August 1951 (tracks 9-12), December 1951 (tracks 1, 3, 4 & 6) and on December 13, 1952 (tracks 2, 5, 7 & 8)

Personnel 
Roy Eldridge - trumpet
Buddy Tate - tenor saxophone (tracks 9-12)
Teddy Brannon (tracks 9-12), Oscar Peterson (tracks 2, 5, 7 & 8) - piano 
Herb Ellis - guitar (tracks 2, 5, 7 & 8)
Clyde Lombardi (tracks 9-12), Ray Brown (tracks 2, 5, 7 & 8) - bass
Charlie Smith (tracks 9-12), J. C. Heard (tracks 2, 5, 7 & 8) - drums
Unidentified orchestra conducted by George Williams (tracks 1, 3, 4 & 6)

References 

1955 albums
Roy Eldridge albums
Clef Records albums
Verve Records albums
Albums produced by Norman Granz